Stocksbridge was a small railway halt, the terminus of, and only railway station on the Stocksbridge Railway. The platform was a simple wooden affair, nothing more was needed to cater for the service provided.

The passenger service, which ran from a west facing bay platform at Deepcar, on the Manchester, Sheffield and Lincolnshire Railways Woodhead Line, commenced operation on 14 April 1877 and ceased in 1931. Operation was undertaken by the Stocksbridge Railway Company who bought two small coaches for the trains, utilising their own locomotive.

In the main, passengers consisted of workers going to Samuel Fox and Company's works and school children.

References 
"Great Central", Vol. 2, "Dominion of Watkin", George Dow, Loco. Publishing Co., London.

Disused railway stations in Sheffield
Stocksbridge